The Forrest D. and Marian Calway House is a historic house located at 318 East Fourth Street in Neillsville, Wisconsin. It was added to the National Register of Historic Places on November 15, 2005.

History
The house was designed for newlyweds Forrest and Marian Calway. Marian was the daughter of Wisconsin State Assemblyman and circuit court judge, James O'Neill (1847-1922). Judge O'Neill was the nephew of the founder of Neillsville, James O'Neill (1810-1882)James O'Neill.

References

Houses in Clark County, Wisconsin
Colonial Revival architecture in Wisconsin
Houses completed in 1917
Houses on the National Register of Historic Places in Wisconsin
1917 establishments in Wisconsin
National Register of Historic Places in Clark County, Wisconsin